is a former Japanese football player.

Playing career
Tokushige was born in Satsumasendai on February 18, 1975. After graduating from high school, he joined Regional Leagues club Nippon Denso (later Denso) in 1993. The club was promoted to Japan Football League from 1996. He played many matches every season. In 2001, he scored 25 goals in 28 matches and became a top scorer in Japan Football League. In 2002, he moved to newly was relegated to J2 League club, Cerezo Osaka. Cerezo was promoted to J1 League end of 2002 season. He played many matches as forward and midfielder every season. However Cerezo was relegated to J2 end of 2006 season. In 2007, he moved to newly was relegated to J2 League club, Kyoto Sanga FC. He played as regular left midfielder and Sanga was promoted to J1 end of 2007 season. However his opportunity to play decreased in 2008. In 2009, he moved to J2 club Tokushima Vortis. He played as regular player in 2009. Although his opportunity to play decreased from 2010, he played many matches every seasons. In 2013, he moved to Regional Leagues club Nagoya SC. He retired end of 2014 season.

Club statistics

References

External links

1975 births
Living people
Association football people from Kagoshima Prefecture
Japanese footballers
J1 League players
J2 League players
Japan Football League (1992–1998) players
Japan Football League players
FC Kariya players
Cerezo Osaka players
Kyoto Sanga FC players
Tokushima Vortis players
Nagoya SC players
Association football midfielders